The 2018 LFL US Season is the ninth season of the Legends Football League (LFL) in the United States. It began on 14 April 2018, and ended on 11 August.

The Chicago Bliss beat the Austin Acoustic 28–20 in the Legends Cup to win their fourth title, finishing with a perfect 6–0 season.

Developments 
In November 2017, it was announced that the Nashville Knights would join the LFL, and begin its inaugural season in the league for the 2018 season, with former Seattle Mist tight end Danika Brace named as the Knights’ head coach. The Pittsburgh Rebellion did not compete in the 2018 season while they conducted a search for a new home venue. They were expected to rejoin the LFL in 2019 but did not.

Nashville's recruitment also resulted in a rule change concerning free agency.  Nashville recruited seven of the starters from defending champion Seattle, essentially transplanting the Mist's lineup to a new team nearly intact.  This move prompted the league to institute a rule only allowing five free agents per team.  As a result of this rule change, Nashville was forced to turn away two of their free agency recruits who returned to Seattle.  Nashville courted further controversy when Seattle's former coach, who had retired in the off-season, reappeared as the offensive coordinator of the Knights.

The LFL partnered with Planet Sport to broadcast LFL games in eastern Europe. The partnership allows Planet Sport to broadcast LFL games and ancillary programming from July 2018 through August 2021.

In January 2018, the LFL announced individual and/or group ownership of existing and future franchises beginning with the 2018 season, continuing to build out the LFL US league, while also developing planned strategies for the revivals of LFL Canada and LFL Australia, as well as to start a new European league in the future.

The 2018 season also saw a major uniform change.  The players' uniforms now featured leggings instead of shorts.  While the league, players, and many fans saw this as a good change there was a vocal segment of the fan base, as well as a group of players, that objected to the leggings.  As a result of the outcry, the LFL changed to shorts, consisting of the same patterns as the pants and 2-3 inches longer than the original bikini brief, for the remainder of the season.

Teams

Eastern Conference

Western Conference

Schedule

Playoffs

Standings

Eastern Conference

Western Conference

x - clinched conference titley - clinched playoff berth

Playoffs 
Conference Championships were played on August 25, 2018 at Toyota Park in the Chicago suburb of Bridgeview, Illinois. The season concluded with the Legends Cup, played on September 8, 2018, at the H-E-B Center in Cedar Park, Texas.

The Los Angeles Temptation were the first team in LFL history to qualify for the playoffs with a losing record but only if the 2016 Atlanta team is considered to have finished 2-2 courtesy of a New England forfeit instead of the 1-2-1 record that a lack of a contest would create.

In their first playoff appearance, the Austin Acoustic defeated Los Angeles 32-30 to advance to their first Legends Cup.  Hours later, the Chicago Bliss defeated the Nashville Knights 18-6 to secure their sixth trip to the Legends Cup.

The Legends Cup featured Chicago as heavy favorites.  The Bliss scored twice in the second quarter and led 12-0 at the half.  Austin scored in the third quarter to cut the lead to 12-8 before Chicago added two more scores to extend their lead to 28-8.  As the game wound down, Austin rallied with two touchdowns of their own leaving the final score 28-20.  With the win, Chicago became the first team in the LFL to win forty games (a cumulative 40-10-1 record) and four championships (2013, 2014, 2016, and 2018).  Chicago running back Javell Thompson, who scored three of the Bliss' four touchdowns, was named MVP of the Legends Cup.

References

External links
Legends Football League official site

Legends Football League
2018 in American football